Nursing Madonna (Italian - Madonna del Latte) is a 14th-century marble sculpture of the Madonna and Child by Andrea Pisano, possibly with some involvement from his son Nino Pisano, originally produced for a niche at the church of Santa Maria della Spina but now in the Museo Nazionale di San Matteo in Pisa.

Sculptures of the Museo Nazionale di San Matteo
14th-century sculptures
Statues of the Madonna and Child
Marble sculptures